Andrew Calandrelli, Jr. is a retired American mixed martial artist. A professional from 2004 until 2014, he competed in Bellator MMA.

Mixed martial arts career

Early career
Calandrelli made his professional MMA debut in 2004. He amassed a record of 4–3 before signing with Bellator.

Bellator MMA
Calandrelli made his Bellator debut at Bellator 48 on August 20, 2011. He faced Matt Nice and won via keylock submission in the first round.

Calandrelli next faced Eric Brown at Bellator 81 on November 16, 2012. He won via armbar submission in the second round.

Over a year away from the cage, Calandrelli eventually returned and faced American Top Team fighter Ryan Quinn in a fight that was originally expected to take place at Bellator 98, but was cancelled prior to the fight due to a medical issue. He lost the fight via unanimous decision.

Mixed martial arts record

|-
|Loss
|align=center|6–4
|Ryan Quinn
|Decision (unanimous)
|Bellator 110
|
|align=center|3
|align=center|5:00
|Uncasville, Connecticut, United States
|
|-
|Win
|align=center|6–3
|Eric Brown
|Submission (armbar)
|Bellator 81
|
|align=center|2
|align=center|3:10
|Kingston, Rhode Island, United States
|
|-
|Win
|align=center|5–3
|Matt Nice
|Submission (keylock)
|Bellator 48
|
|align=center|1
|align=center|3:55
|Uncasville, Connecticut, United States
|
|-
|Loss
|align=center|4–3
|Mark Berrocal
|KO (punches)
|ROC 16: Beast of the Northeast Semi-Finals
|
|align=center|1
|align=center|0:35
|Atlantic City, New Jersey, United States
|
|-
|Win
|align=center|4–2
|Doug Gordon
|Decision (majority)
|ROC 15: Beast of the Northeast Quarterfinals
|
|align=center|2
|align=center|4:00
|Atlantic City, New Jersey, United States
|
|-
|Win
|align=center|3–2
|Jason Hathaway
|Submission (rear-naked choke)
|CZ 17: Take Control
|
|align=center|1
|align=center|3:39
|Revere, Massachusetts, United States
|
|-
|Win
|align=center|2–2
|Lionel Cortez
|Decision (unanimous)
|ECFA: Colosseum
|
|align=center|2
|align=center|5:00
|Massachusetts, United States
|
|-
|Win
|align=center|1–2
|Jason Hathaway
|Submission (rear-naked choke)
|CZ 9: Hot Like Fire
|
|align=center|1
|align=center|3:52
|Revere, Massachusetts, United States
|
|-
|Loss
|align=center|0–2
|Rich Moskowitz
|Decision (unanimous)
|CZ 8: Street Justice
|
|align=center|3
|align=center|5:00
|Revere, Massachusetts, United States
|
|-
|Loss
|align=center|0–1
|Rich Moskowitz
|Decision (unanimous)
|Last Man Standing
|
|align=center|3
|align=center|5:00
|Fitchburg, Massachusetts, United States
|

References

Living people
Sportspeople from New Haven, Connecticut
American male mixed martial artists
Mixed martial artists from Connecticut
Lightweight mixed martial artists
Year of birth missing (living people)